José María Sánchez García (born 3 November 1963 in Madrid) is a Spanish lawyer, jurist, professor and politician who is a member of the Vox party. Since 2019 he has been a deputy in the Congress of Deputies representing the Alicante constituency.

Biography
García was born in Madrid in 1963. He studied law degrees at the Collegio di Spagna campus for Spanish students affiliated to the University of Bologna and at the University of Toulouse in France. After graduating he worked as a partner at Baker & McKenzie in the United States and then Olswang in London for a period. He was also a lawyer for the European Court of Justice and a high court judge in Spain but took leave of absence from the latter role after becoming a politician. García also teaches law at the University of Seville.

Political career
García stood as a candidate for Vox ahead of the November 2019 Spanish general election for the Alicante constituency and was elected as a deputy for the 14th Congress of Deputies. In the Congress, he sits on the committees for Justice, Constitution and Territorial policy. He has also been a member of the cross-party commission on the COVID-19 pandemic and vaccine rollout.

During his tenure in the Congress of Deputies, García has been accused of making controversial or insulting remarks about rival politicians. During a debate on the national budget in December 2020, he referred to People's Party deputy  as the "Galician screamer" during a dispute. In September 2021, he allegedly called Spanish Socialist Workers' Party politician  a "witch" during her speech on a debate on whether to criminalize protests outside abortion clinics. In 2022, García compared Spanish Prime Minister Pedro Sánchez to Hitler and Minister of the Presidency Félix Bolaños to Goebbels. After being offered to withdraw the comments by the speaker of the Congress García refused.

References 

1963 births
Living people
Members of the 14th Congress of Deputies (Spain)
Vox (political party) politicians
Lawyers from Madrid
Spanish educators
20th-century Spanish judges